Bruce William Woodley  (born 25 July 1942) is an Australian singer-songwriter and musician. He was a founding member of the successful folk-pop group the Seekers, and co-composer of the songs "I Am Australian," "Red Rubber Ball," and Simon & Garfunkel's "Cloudy."

Early life
Bruce Woodley was born on 25 July 1942 in Melbourne, Victoria, Australia. He attended Melbourne High School with fellow Seekers, Athol Guy and Keith Potger.

The Seekers

Woodley had a 'residency' performing at the Treble Clef restaurant in Prahran. With former schoolmates, Athol Guy and Keith Potger, he formed a folk music trio, The Escorts, in the early 1960s. Soon before the arrival of vocalist Judith Durham in 1962 they became The Seekers, and had some success in Australia before travelling to London in 1964 and recording four international hit singles written and produced by Tom Springfield. Woodley played guitar, banjo, and mandolin, as well as one of the four-part vocal harmony, and was the chief songwriter. While Durham sang the majority of lead vocals for the group, Woodley usually handled the male lead vocals, including a number of album tracks. The Seekers first disbanded in 1968.

During 1965, while in London, Woodley met Paul Simon, following the poor performance of Wednesday Morning 3 A.M. and just prior to the success of Simon and Garfunkel. Simon and Woodley co-wrote the million-selling "Red Rubber Ball"—later a Top Five hit for US group The Cyrkle. The Simon and Woodley collaboration also provided "I Wish You Could Be Here" and "Cloudy". The Seekers later recorded these three songs, and "Cloudy" became an album track on Simon and Garfunkel's hit 1966 album Parsley, Sage, Rosemary and Thyme—the only Simon and Woodley song to appear on both groups' album. However, Woodley's relationship with Simon had deteriorated and Woodley later struggled to get his share of the royalties—his songwriting credit on "Cloudy" was omitted from the release of Parsley, Sage, Rosemary and Thyme. However, Simon does receive a credit for the song on The Seekers' album, Seekers Seen in Green.

Going solo
Woodley's first solo venture was a production company called Pennywheel, which saw him release a number of products for children, including a "Build an Alphabet" set of blocks and the 1969 EP and board book, "Friday St. Fantasy". In 1969, Bruce headed off to America to sell the songs he had been writing, and was to remain there for several years. During this period he collaborated with a number of writers including John Farrar and Australian folk singer Hans Poulsen. Their compositions "Lady Scorpio" performed by Australian band The Strangers, "Monty and Me" performed by Zoot (which included a young Rick Springfield) and "Boom-Sha-La-La-Lo" which became a hit for Poulsen.

In 1971, Woodley released his first solo album, entitled Just Good Friends. In a reaction to the folk stereotype of the Seekers, the original album cover featured two naked models having sex. This was deemed too raunchy for Australia and the cover was replaced by a photo of Woodley. The original cover, however, was allowed in New Zealand, and this version of the album is a collectors item today. Three years later, Woodley contributed to an Australian-themed album put out by Viscount cigarettes, called The Roaring Days Vol. 1 (after a Henry Lawson poem). A second volume never eventuated. He also had a hit song called "Love Me Tonight Baby". The album featured Woodley performing the traditional folk song "Eumerella Shore" and some of his own compositions, including "The Bush Girl", which he would later re-record for a double album in 1987, with The Seekers in 1997 and 2000, and with his daughter Claire Woodley in 2001.

Seekers reunions
Woodley reunited with the Seekers, composed of fellow original members Athol Guy and Keith Potger, and 23-year-old Dutch-born Louisa Wisseling (a semi-professional folk singer formerly with Melbourne band The Settlers). In a February 1975 newspaper article about the group's reunion, Louisa revealed that Bruce had approached her at a 1974 Settlers concert at Ferntree Gully's Swagman Restaurant with an offer to join the group, and she originally turned him down. The new group recorded two albums and a number of singles, some of which, like "The Nimble Song" and "I Saw It All With Trans Tours" (both written by Woodley) reflected the boys' other careers in advertising. Woodley's composition "The Sparrow Song" became the group's biggest 1970s hit and remains to this day the highest-charting Seekers single written by a member of the group. Other tracks he contributed to this line-up included "Giving and Takin'" (the title track of their second album), "Can We Learn to Get Along" (which began life as a solo recording for the TV documentary series Shell's Australia, and was released by Bruce on flexi-disc), "Reunion", "Country Ros", "Standing on Shaky Ground" (featuring Bruce on vocals which he felt were too low for him, but were impossible for Louisa to sing for the same reason), and "The Rose and the Briar".

In 1977, Bruce left the group and was replaced by Buddy England. He continued to focus on song-writing and advertising, producing many TV jingles including one for Courage beer. His first, back in 1971 was a solo (advertising) single called "The ANZ Bank Travelling Man", and was given out free to employees of that institution as part of the promotion.

I Am Australian
The year 1987 saw Woodley involved in the preparations for the Australian Bicentenary, and the release of an Australian-themed double album, songbook and cassette tape, featuring covers of traditional songs and some of Woodley's own compositions. The set was called I Am Australian, after a jingle that he wrote to tie together the various threads of the project, tapping into the need he perceived for a national song in which people could take pride. One of his colleagues on the project was Dobe Newton of The Bushwackers, who helped compose the words of the title song; another was noted folk singer Rose Bygrave. The recordings also featured a children's choir including Claire Woodley.

The following year he reunited with The Seekers, this time featuring Julie Anthony as the lead singer, to perform "The Carnival is Over" at Expo '88 and a musical about the Seekers' journey. This line-up released an album in 1989; "Live On", the title track, was composed by Woodley, as were many of the other new tracks like "The Streets of Serenade" (which charted the story of the Seekers rather more blatantly than his '70s composition "Reunion"), "One Step Forward, Two Steps Back", "How Can a Love So Wrong Be So Right" and "Taking My Chances With You". When Julie left to have a baby (daughter Tamara), former Young Talent Time singer Karen Knowles joined the group. The only studio recordings by this line-up are the Bruce Woodley written songs "Fools Tonight" and "Bright Star", sold as a cassingle at concerts.  "Bright Star", originally written for Julie's voice, was also performed by both the Julie- and Karen-led Seekers at Carols by Candlelight.

When original lead singer Judith Durham returned to The Seekers fold in late 1992 for the group's 25 Year Silver Jubilee, the theme song and CD-Single of the reunion was Woodley's composition "Keep A Dream In Your Pocket". A 1993 live album and DVD followed, featuring many of the group's hits and a song which would become one of their best known, Woodley's "I Am Australian".

The success of "I Am Australian" took Woodley completely by surprise. In 1991, he performed it with Karen and the Australian Children's Choir on a televised drought appeal, featuring a new, drought-themed verse which has not appeared on other recordings.  "I Am Australian" has featured in all Woodley's solo tours and all Seekers tours since the reunion with Judith Durham; in 2000 the Seekers performed a condensed version at the televised Australia Day concert. Many artists have covered the song; in 1997, Durham released a version with Russell Hitchcock and Mandawuy Yunupingu which entered the Australian charts. For many , it has become the unofficial anthem, and is a staple performed at many national events, by such artists as Jon Stevens, Delta Goodrem and naturally Bruce and the Seekers. At the 2001 celebrations for the Centenary of Federation, Woodley performed the song with daughter Claire (now known for performing the song solo at many events herself) and co-writer Dobe Newton.

Woodley divorced in the '80s after a 14-year marriage, and he and former wife Sally have two children, Claire and a son, Dan. With Claire, a burgeoning singer-songwriter in her own right who has performed on the cabaret and conference circuit, he recorded a CD in 2001 called, once again, "I am Australian". He has since recorded an ANZAC themed version of "I am Australian", titled "The Anzac Song", and appeared on Melbourne radio advertising the release of a CD-Single several weeks before Anzac Day in 2005. Apparently due to production difficulties, it never eventuated. In 2005 Bruce was interviewed by music journalist Debbie Kruger for a new book entitled Songwriters Speak, focusing on influential and successful Australian singer-songwriters.

At the National Day of Mourning on 22 February 2009 for the victims of the Victoria bushfires, Woodley unveiled two new verses for "I am Australian".

Other work
Woodley's non-musical work includes public speaking through the Saxton Speakers Bureau, and he is the patron of various organisations such as the NIYPAA (National Institute of Youth Performing Arts Australia). He is also a member of the Advisory Board of the organisation TLC for Kids, and was for a time, beginning in 1997, the chairman of the Victorian branch of the Variety Club.

Discography

Songwriter and performer
1964 The Seekers: "Myra" (Durham/Guy/Potger/Woodley)
1965 The Seekers: "Two Summers" (Woodley)
1965 The Seekers: "Don't Tell Me My Mind" (Woodley)
1966 The Seekers: "Come the Day" (Woodley)
1966 The Seekers: "Red Rubber Ball" (Woodley/Simon)
1966 The Seekers: "I Wish You Could Be Here" (Woodley/Simon)
1967 The Seekers: "Love is Kind, Love is Wine" (Woodley)
1967 The Seekers: "The Sad Cloud" (Woodley/Westlake)
1967 The Seekers: "Chase a Rainbow (Follow Your Dream)" (Woodley)
1967 The Seekers: "Angeline is Always Friday" (Tom Paxton/Woodley)
1967 The Seekers: "Cloudy" (Woodley/Simon)
1967 The Seekers: "Rattler" (Woodley)
1969 Bruce Woodley: "Friday Street Fantasy" [EP] ("Friday Man/Little One/Little Miss Sorrow/Captain Grumblepeg")
1969                "Friday Man/Captain Grumblepeg" [45]
1971                "Just Good Friends" [lp]
1971                "Friends/Rattler" [45]
1974                "The Roaring Days Vol. 1" [lp]
1987                "I am Australian" [box set: 2lp, book, cassette] (Woodley/Dobe Newton)
1997 The Seekers: "The Bush Girl" (Woodley/Lawson)
1997 The Seekers: "The Shores of Avalon" (Arrangement and original lyrics: Durham/Guy/Kovac/Potger/Woodley)
1997 The Seekers: "Amazing" (Woodley/Cristian)
1997 The Seekers  "Gotta Love Someone" (Woodley/Cristian)
[ND] Bruce Woodley: "Can We Learn to Get Along" [45]
[ND]                "The ANZ Bank Travelling Man" [promo 45]
[ND]                "The Colours of Your Days" [45]

Songwriter only
1966 Simon and Garfunkel: "Cloudy", (Woodley/Simon) on the album Parsley, Sage, Rosemary and Thyme US #4 album (Woodley co-writing credit omitted)
1967 The Cyrkle: "Red Rubber Ball" (Woodley/Simon) US #2
1967 The Cyrkle: "I Wish You Could Be Here" (Woodley/Simon) US #70
1967 Herman's Hermits: Little Miss Sorrow, Child of Tomorrow (Woodley) on the album There's a Kind of Hush all Over the World.
1967 Herman's Hermits: Rattler (Woodley) on the album "'There's a Kind of Hush all Over the World.
1967 Lulu: Rattler (Woodley) on the album Love Loves to Love Lulu (To Sir, with Love)
Hans Poulsen: "Boom Sha La La Lo" (Poulsen/Woodley)
1969 Zoot: "Monty & Me" (Poulsen/Woodley)
1969 The Strangers "Lady Scorpio" (Poulsen /Woodley)

References
   
General
Books
Kruger, Debbie;  Songwriters Speak, Limelight Press, Australia, August 2005.
Simpson, Graham;  Colours of my life : the Judith Durham Story, Random House, Australia, 1994, 1998, 2005.
Woodley, Bruce;  Friday Street Fantasy and Other Stories, Paul Hamlyn & Pennywheel, Australia, 1969.
Woodley, Bruce;  I am Australian Songbook, Australia: np., 1987.

ArticlesThe Weekend Australian, The Australian magazine, 11–12 April 1992. pp. 32–35 and cover.  – Bruce's involvement with IAA (I am Australian) FoundationThe Age'', Property, 14 August 1982.  – Interview with Sally Woodley about sale of Brighton residence

Specific

External links
"I am Australian" lyrics with REAL AUDIO featuring Bruce Woodley and daughter Claire Woodley at Aussie Connection

The Seekers at MILESAGO
Songwriters Speak – Official website

The Seekers members
1942 births
Australian male composers
Australian composers
Australian guitarists
Australian pop singers
Australian tenors
Living people
People educated at Melbourne High School
Musicians from Melbourne
Australian banjoists
Australian expatriates in the United Kingdom
20th-century guitarists
Australian folk-pop singers
Acoustic guitarists
20th-century Australian male singers
Australian male guitarists
Australian male singer-songwriters